Never Trust a Hippy is an EP by the American punk rock band NOFX, released March 14, 2006 through Fat Wreck Chords. Released a month in advance of the band's tenth studio album, Wolves in Wolves' Clothing, the EP includes two tracks from the album and four others recorded during the album's recording sessions. The EP was made available for streaming on March 12 via Alternative Press.

Background
In 2003, NOFX's Regaining Unconsciousness EP had served as a pre-release teaser for their ninth studio album The War on Errorism. Never Trust a Hippy served as a similar teaser for their next studio album, Wolves in Wolves' Clothing. All of the tracks on the EP were recorded during the album sessions at Motor Studios in San Francisco with the production team of Bill Stevenson and Jason Livermore from The Blasting Room, with NOFX bandleader Fat Mike also producing. Stevenson and Livermore served as recording and mixing engineers for the sessions that produced "Seeing Double at the Triple Rock", "The Marxist Brothers", "Golden Boys", and "Everything in Moderation (Especially Moderation)". Adam Krammer, who had worked with the band since 1997's So Long and Thanks for All the Shoes, served as recording engineer for the sessions that produced "You're Wrong" and "I'm Going to Hell for This One", which were then mixed by Livermore. Both the EP and the album were mastered by Livermore at The Blasting Room in Fort Collins, Colorado. Comic book artist Rick Remender created the cover artwork for the EP, while Brian Archer did the design and layout.

The tracks "Golden Boys", "You're Wrong", and "I'm Going to Hell for This One" are new recordings of songs that originally appeared in NOFX's 7" of the Month Club, a series of twelve 7-inch gramophone records released by the band between February 2005 and January 2006. "Golden Boys" is a cover version; the song was originally recorded in 1984 by Vagina Dentata, a post-Germs project of guitarist Pat Smear.

Reception

Corey Apar of Allmusic rated the EP three and a half stars out of five, saying "Fat Mike and crew have packed six songs into 13 minutes of cutting observation and criticism. On 'The Marxist Brothers', the band uses a backdrop that recalls The Clash's "London Calling" to underline ironic remarks about contemporary anarchists. Religious overtones also dot the entire release, with a rebellious, drug-taking Jesus resurrected to beat up Mel Gibson and collect his royalty checks in 'I'm Going to Hell for This One', while the acoustic 'You're Wrong' lets all right-wing and religious folk know their interpretation of the Bible and attitudes toward other issues are, well, wrong."<ref name="Apar">{{cite web |last=Apar |first=Corey |title=Review: Never Trust a Hippy |publisher=Allmusic |work=allmusic.com |url=http://www.allmusic.com/album/never-trust-a-hippy-mw0000351050 |accessdate=2016-04-18}}</ref> Christian Hoard of Rolling Stone'' gave it three stars out of five, saying "On this six-cut EP, these long-running punks strike a nice balance between leftist splatter and their bratty bread-and-butter, tossing in speed-metal mayhem like 'Everything in Moderation (Especially Moderation)' alongside embittered politico rants like 'You're Wrong'." Critic Robert Christgau simply gave the EP a "cut" rating, recommending only "You're Wrong".

Track listing

Personnel
Credits adapted from the EP's liner notes.
Band
Fat Mike – lead vocals, bass guitar, producer
El Hefe – guitar, backing vocals
Eric Melvin – guitar, backing vocals
Erik Sandin – drums

Production
Bill Stevenson – recording engineer, mixing engineer (tracks 1–3 and 5); producer (all tracks)
Jason Livermore – recording engineer (tracks 1–3 and 5); producer, mixing engineer, audio mastering (all tracks)
Adam Krammer – recording engineer (tracks 4 and 6)

Artwork
Rick Remender – artwork
Brian Archer – layout and design

References

External links

Never Trust a Hippy at YouTube (streamed copy where licensed)

NOFX EPs
2006 EPs
Fat Wreck Chords EPs